The Institute of Transportation (IOT) is the organization under the Ministry of Transportation and Communications of the Republic of China responsible for assisting the ministry in making policy, coordinating and integrating transportation strategies, executing plans, supporting administrative innovative research and technology and establishing communication channel between the government, transportation industries, academia and research institutions in Taiwan.

History
The institute was originally established as Transportation Planning Board on 1 August 1970. On 5 January 1985, it was merged with the former Institute of Traffic Research to establish the Institute of Transportation.

Organizational structure
 Harbor and Marine Technology Center
 Interdisciplinary Research Division
 Transportation Information System Division
 Transportation Operations and Management Division
 Transportation Safety Division
 Transportation Engineering Division
 Transportation Planning Division
 Secretariat
 Accounting Office
 Personnel Office

Director-generals
 Lin Chi-kuo (incumbent)
 Wu Yuh-jen (25 October 2016 - 5 June 2018)
 Chi Wen-jong (22 August 2016 - 24 October 2016)
 Lin Shinn-der (16 January 2015 - 21 August 2016)
 Lin Tyh-ming (16 July 2010 - 15 January 2015)
 Huang Der-chyr (1 March 2004 - 15 July 2010)
 Lin Dah-yuh (11 September 1997 - 29 February 2004)
 Lin Dah-yuh (1 August 1997 - 10 September 1997) (acting)
 Chang Yu-hern (1 August 1995 - 31 July 1997)
 Feng Cheng-min (1 March 1995 - 31 July 1995)
 Chang Chia-juch (1 October 1987 - 28 February 1995)
 Huang Jia-he (5 January 1985 - 30 September 1987)

Transportation
The building is accessible within walking distance south from Songshan Airport Station of the Taipei Metro.

See also
 Executive Yuan
 Transportation in Taiwan

References

External links
 

1985 establishments in Taiwan
Executive Yuan
Government agencies established in 1985
Transportation organizations based in Taiwan